Bothloko Shebe (born 13 October 1971) is a Lesotho sprinter. He competed in the men's 100 metres at the 1992 Summer Olympics.

References

1971 births
Living people
Athletes (track and field) at the 1992 Summer Olympics
Lesotho male sprinters
Olympic athletes of Lesotho
Place of birth missing (living people)